Hallikainen is a Finnish surname. Notable people with the surname include:

Joel Hallikainen (born 1961), Finnish musician and entertainer
Joonas Hallikainen (born 1985), Finnish ice hockey player

Finnish-language surnames
Surnames of Finnish origin